Wakanokuni Takeo (born 4 April 1936 as Teruo Ito) is a former sumo wrestler from Nannō, Gifu, Japan. He made his professional debut in March 1953 and reached the top division in November 1959. His highest rank was maegashira 8. He left the sumo world upon retirement from active competition in September 1969.

Career record
The Kyushu tournament was first held in 1957, and the Nagoya tournament in 1958.

See also
Glossary of sumo terms
List of past sumo wrestlers
List of sumo tournament second division champions

References

1936 births
Living people
Japanese sumo wrestlers
Sumo people from Gifu Prefecture